R. Roberts (given names and dates unknown) was an English cricketer active from 1872 to 1874 who played for Lancashire. He appeared in ten first-class matches, sometimes as a wicketkeeper. He scored 100 runs with a highest score of 20 and held nine catches with five stumpings.

Notes

Date of birth unknown
Date of death unknown
English cricketers
Lancashire cricketers